Germany's Next Topmodel Cycle 2, started airing on 1 March 2007 with a batch of 15 fresh wannabe models and the judges that would determine the winner. Two girls, Sophie and Alina, left during the second episode after deciding that their education was more important. Tonia Michaely and Denise Dahinten replaced the two contestants. This season was commercially presented by Opel Tigra Twin Top and Staatl. Fachingen. Finalist Hana Nitsche started a huge career as a lingerie model even shooting a campaign for Victoria's Secret, while winner Barbara Meier started a career as a high fashion model.

The international destinations for this cycle were set in St. Moritz, Cape Town, Bangkok and Los Angeles.

Episode summaries

Episode 1: Welche 15 Mädchen werden es in die nächste Runde schaffen?
Original airdate: 1 March 2007

Out of over 16,000 applicants, the judges selected 100 girls as semi-finalists, who then had to prove themselves in a model castings. The applicants had only 2 minutes to win over the judges with their charisma and personality. From the 100, 25 were chosen, and given their first task - a fashion show at the Signal Iduna Park in Dortmund, Germany's largest football stadium, where they had to do a catwalk down the field during half-time in front of over 70,000 football fans watching the Borussia Dortmund vs. VfB Stuttgart game. At the end of the second day of casting, ten of the girls are eliminated, and the 15 that would move on to the house were determined.

Episode 2: Das erste große Einzel-Fotoshooting steht bevor
Original airdate: 8 March 2007

The 15 finalists arrived in St. Moritz and went to their first photo shoot on a snow-covered mountain for German Cosmopolitan. After this photo shoot, Sophie and Alina decided to leave the show to return to school. Then the contestants had their first challenge, won by Aneta. Finally, they went to their first important photo shoot, posing in front of a gigantic fan with a car behind them. Previously eliminated contestants Tonia and Denise replaced Alina and Sophie. Heidi Klum, watching the photo shoot, spoke highly of Denise's creative poses, saying she hasn't ever seen poses like them before. In the end, Janine was the first model eliminated, due to a lack of expression in her photos.

Quit: Sophie & Alina
Comeback: Tonia Michaely & Denise Dahinten
Eliminated: Janine Mackenroth

Episode 3: Einzug ins neue Zuhause
Original airdate: 15 March 2007

In the third episode, the girls move into their new house. Bruce and Boris train them in three styles of runway-walk and make-up: sporty, young virgin, and sexy. Later the girls are given publicity training with comedian Hugo Egon Balder; Barbara wins the challenge, and chooses Janina to share her prize - a three-course dinner with Heidi Klum at a hotel. For the photo shoot, the girls pose in Swarovski Crystals and bald caps. At judging, Enyerlina and Antje are not as good as the other girls and they are eliminated.

Eliminated: Enyerlina Sanchez & Antje Pötke

Episode 4: Der neue Style
Original airdate: 22 March 2007

The contestants got new haircuts in this episode. They were also forced to pass the "Falling Fairytales" photo shoot from America's Next Top Model, Cycle 6. Janina could not convince the judges and was eliminated. Fiona provoked Hana by compromising her in front of judge member Peyman Amin: During a fake casting Fiona was asked to play the casting agent requesting Hana to present a sock to the customer. She worked herself up over this matter so Hana felt offended. Later Fiona apologized for the time being.

Eliminated: Janina Cüpper

Episode 5: Es wird eisig...
Original airdate: 29 March 2007

During the fashion show of the designer Susanne Marx of the AMD ("Akademie Mode & Design") fashion school in Düsseldorf Philips hall Alla and Anja were not allowed to walk the runway. At not less than 2000 invited guests, it was a chance for three of the contestants to present themselves to the designers Johnny Talbot and Adrian Runhof and their prêt-à-porter fashion show in Paris, France. The designers decided to take Hana, Fiona and Milla.

Their challenge this week was a photo shoot with a male model depicting the four seasons through mien and gestures authentically. This was useful for the contestants to learn the difference between Commercial Posing and Editorial Posing. The winners Tonia, Denise, Mandy and Barbara were allowed to spend the evening with the male models, with which they had to work for the shoot. The other contestants had to clean the house.

This week's photo shoot took place in a cold storage house with the photographer Matt McCabe. The contestants had to deal with enormous low temperature as they were forced to pose with ice sculptures in mini skirts and mini dresses. Before the elimination every contestant had to do a live-walk and demonstrate one's learning aptitude by presenting a fire brigade outfit in Editorial Posing and another product in Commercial Posing.

The judges were not thrilled of Alla's performance this week, so she was the one to be eliminated.

Booked for job: Fiona Erdmann, Hana Nitsche & Milla von Krockow
Challenge winner: Tonia Michaely, Denise Dahinten, Mandy Graff & Barbara Meier
Eliminated: Alla Kosovan
Featured photographers: Matt McCabe, Oliver S.
Special guests: Designer Johnny Talbot, Adrian Runhof, Designer Susanne Marx & Fank Wilde
Guest judge: Matt McCabe

Episode 6: Knutsch die Kröte
Original airdate: 5 April 2007

After acting lessons, eight of the ten girls went on a professional casting for a car advert being shot in Cape Town - Denise and Fiona were nominated by the other contestants to stay at home and miss the casting. Hana won the job.

Also, for winning a challenge, Anni was chosen to be in the music video for the song "Zwei Sommer" by German singer Kim Frank.

She was encouraged to pick three contestants who knew how to play guitar or keyboards to co-star in the video. She asked the others if anyone could play those instruments, but no one said they did. Anni selected Mandy, Milla and Aneta. Anni later complained the video left her with bruising from pretending to play guitar all day.

The contestants shot a television commercial for an online dating agency. They each were dressed as a fairy princess for the ad in which they found a frog, and gave him a kiss. Frustrated when he didn't turn into a prince, they angrily demanded he do so, insisting he wanted to. The commercial was not shot in one continuous take. At this point, so as to avoid cruelty, the real frog was swapped for a fake frog. Then shoot resumed, as the model tossed the fake frog down in frustration at the end of the commercial. Denise was clumsy during the shoot. She also wanted a lot of reassurance from the director, to the point of neediness and requesting a hug. Heidi was on the set and witnessed this behavior. Denise was eliminated at the end of this episode.

Booked for job: Hana Nitsche
Challenge winner: Anni Wendler
Eliminated: Denise Dahinten
Featured producer: Andreas Kayales
Special guests: Kim Frank & Ursula Michelis
Guest judge: Andreas Kayales

Episode 7: Heiße Action
Original airdate: 12 April 2007

This week's photo shoot was placed in an action setting. The contestants had to stay concentrated despite loud explosion noises in the background. Barbara was asked to co-star with Heidi Klum in a McDonald's television commercial as a reward for winning an acting challenge.

The casting director said she was not necessarily the best actor, but would be the best one for the commercial. The contestants' parents surprised their daughters by making a visit. Hana's boyfriend made a bad joke by pretending not to come but then arriving later on. Hana was not amused unlike her boyfriend who laughed a lot and apparently enjoyed having teased her.

Booked for job: Barbara Meier
Challenge winner: Aneta Tobor, Anja Platzer, Anni Wendler, Barbara Meier, Fiona Erdmann & Milla von Krockow 
Eliminated: Tonia Michaely & Aneta Tobor
Featured photographer: Mario Schmolka
Special guests: Caroline Nippert, Johann Stockhammer & Sascha Lutzi 
Guest judge: Mario Schmolka

Episode 8: Ein tierisch gutes Shooting
Original airdate: 19 April 2007

This week the seven contestants traveled to Bangkok to participate in a casting for the Thai fashion label Fly Now. Five of the seven contestants were allowed to walk the runway which was placed in a calf-high swimming pool. The designer chose Anja and Fiona not to walk along with the others. The next day the contestants traveled to Los Angeles for a photo shoot with an elephant and a barely dressed man. The judges eliminated Milla due to a lack of expression in her face.

Eliminated: Milla von Krockow

Episode 9: Topmodel trifft Superstar
Original airdate: 26 April 2007

The contestants stayed in Los Angeles for another week. Their first challenge was to act professionally on the red carpet surrounded by celebrities and actors. Anja was chosen as this challenge's winner and was given the chance to jaunt on a yacht along with Mandy while the other contestants had to go for broke at a fitness lesson.

All of the contestants then participated in a casting with Christian Audigier, designer of the successfully rising fashion label Ed Hardy. Hana, Mandy and Barbara were chosen to walk the runway at a well visited fashion show.

This week's photo shoot demanded a great deal of the contestants as they had to pose like superheroes knotted with ropes between house walls of Los Angeles. Fiona later preached on Mandy and Hana as she stated they sometimes considered to leave the competition. Fiona then obviously lost many viewers' sympathies regarding internet polls and surveys. The judges' problem child Anja finally had to leave the show as they could not find enough enhancements regarding her achievements all over the show.

Challenge winner: Anja Platzer
Booked for job: Barbara Meier, Hana Nitsche & Mandy Graff
Eliminated: Anja Platzer
Featured photographer: Antoine Verglas
Special guest: Christian Audigier
Guest judge: Antoine Verglas

Episode 10: Bodypainting am Malibu Beach
Original airdate: 3 May 2007

For this week's photo shoot, the contestants had to go the full monty as their bodies were covered only by body color during a body painting session at the Malibu Beach. Runway coach Bruce Darnell forced the girls to find foot passengers in Hollywood's Rodeo Drive to argue them into a photo shoot for which they had to imitate film posters. Anni stuck out with her outstanding achievement and was allowed to fly with a helicopter and watch California's night life from above. Anni and Hana began to backbite – Fiona being the victim. When Fiona tried to talk things out Hana evaded the issue. Due to the show's success, the producers decided to elongate it by an additional episode with no elimination.

Eliminated: None

Episode 11: Das große Cosmopolitan-Shooting steht bevor
Original airdate: 10 May 2007

The five remaining girls style and photograph themselves for a shoot at a villa in the Hollywood Hills, at which they are allowed to take revenge on judge Peyman Amin for his mean appraisals. The shoot is curtailed when a bush fire breaks out nearby. The girls have their photo shoot for the winner's Cosmopolitan cover; Mandy and Barbara have to do theirs again. They then have to answer questions in English at a press conference with American journalists; the language barrier is an obstacle, and Barbara is upset when she inadvertently says something she thinks will upset her boyfriend. They are relieved to find out afterwards that the journalists were actors. At the judging, the girls have to walk in both pret-a-porter and haute couture clothes. Mandy is eliminated.

Eliminated: Mandy Graff

Episode 12: Wiedersehen mit allen 15 Kandidatinnen
Original airdate: 17 May 2007

Eliminated: Fiona Erdmann

Episode 13: Das Finale
Original airdate: 24 May 2007

Though officially described as "live " the finale was recorded in the afternoon of 24 May and shown at 8.15 PM the same day. It began with Heidi Klum introducing the three finalists: Anni, Hana, and Barbara. Their first live challenge was a bikini-themed catwalk and another one with old-fashioned dresses. Shortly after that, last week's photos were shown to the audience. The contestants had to explain their ideas and implementation. Then Hana was eliminated without any explanation by the judges which displeased the audience and the viewers booed loudly.

Final three: Anni Wendler, Barbara Meier & Hana Nitsche
Eliminated: Hana Nitsche

For the next challenge runway trainer Bruce Darnell was asked to do a "spontaneous" photo shoot with Wendler and Meier themed "Romeo and Juliet" and "Caught in the Act". After that clips of all three finalists were accompanied with a live-played saxophone song. The saxophone preluded to an opera version of Ave Maria with all of this season's contestants walking the runway dressed in baroque and unique appearing robes. The studio was quiet for a few seconds before Monrose's "Hot Summer" started and the band members began to walk the runway. As the second verse began all contestants came on stage one by one and did another catwalk walk. Then the final announcement was made: Barbara is "Germany's Next Topmodel".

Final two: Anni Wendler & Barbara Meier
Germany's Next Topmodel: Barbara Meier

Episode 14: Was keiner sah
Original airdate: 31 May 2007

This episode was announced as a collection of unaired additional footage from all twelve episodes but half of the episode turned out to be a summary of shown footage. The last one and a half hours showed the contestants at a Spin the Bottle play, a boxing training, a report of contestant Hana being sick and some other scenes.

Contestants

(ages stated are at start of contest)

Summaries

Results table

 The contestant withdrew from the competition
 The contestant was in danger of elimination
 The contestant was eliminated
 The contestant was one of the best performers of the week, and was declared safe before the elimination ceremony
 The contestant won the competition

Photo shoot guide
Episode 2 photo shoot: Wind tunnel
Episode 3 photo shoot: Bald heads
Episode 4 photo shoot: Falling fairy tale characters
Episode 5 photo shoot: Posing on ice blocks
Episode 6 photo shoot: Advertising spot
Episode 7 photo shoot: Action and explosion
Episode 8 photo shoot: Wildlife with Tarzan
Episode 9 photo shoot: Superheroes
Episode 10 photo shoot: Body painting
Episode 11 photo shoots: "We hate peyman"; Cosmopolitan Germany Cover
Episode 12 photo shoot: Contestants' choice
Episode 13 photo shoots: Romeo and Juliet; caught in the act

Controversy
Many fans were able to find out the eliminated contestant from the next week's episode beforehand.
Eyerlina Sanchez had enter in Miss Dominican Republic 2002.
Denise Dahinten's elimination was confirmed by studio guests of that day's episode of late night show TV total in which the eliminated contestants used to appear after their elimination.
Host channel ProSieben booked a web domain for each contestant's name, e.g. www.fiona-erdmann.de – the only names that were not booked were Tonia Michaely, Aneta Tobor and Michaela "Milla" Gräfin von Krockow so their elimination was indirectly confirmed.
An Austrian newspaper published a report on Anja Platzer being home again, confirming her elimination the next week.
Friends of Mandy's divulged her elimination in several internet forums.
As the 11th episode ended with a cliffhanger leaving open if either Fiona Erdmann or Anni Wendler would be one of the final three, fans began to collect details and indices that would reveal the last finalist. Some television guides accidentally published photos of Wendler, Barbara Meier, and Hana Nitsche. Also paparazzi photos of the three were shot and leaked into the internet. But the most airtight proof was a mumbled statement by judge members Heidi Klum and Peyman Amin who stated they thought "those three really deserve to get into the final show". For one or two seconds the viewer was able to have a glimpse on three photos separated from two others. The two put aside were those of Erdmann and Mandy Graff.

In February 2023, the Berliner Zeitung published an article about the show with the headline: "Why isn't Germany’s Next Topmodel actually canceled?"

References

External links
Official website
 

Germany's Next Topmodel
2007 German television seasons
Television shows filmed in Germany
Television shows filmed in Switzerland
Television shows filmed in South Africa
Television shows filmed in France
Television shows filmed in Thailand
Television shows filmed in Los Angeles
Television shows filmed in Portugal